Kamionki may refer to the following places:
Kamionki, Greater Poland Voivodeship (west-central Poland)
Kamionki, Masovian Voivodeship (east-central Poland)
Kamionki, Świętokrzyskie Voivodeship (south-central Poland)
Kamionki, Pomeranian Voivodeship (north Poland)
Kamionki, Giżycko County in Warmian-Masurian Voivodeship (north Poland)
Kamionki, Gołdap County in Warmian-Masurian Voivodeship (north Poland)
Kamionki, West Pomeranian Voivodeship (north-west Poland)